The 1900 South Carolina gubernatorial election was held on November 6, 1900 to select the governor of the state of South Carolina. Governor Miles Benjamin McSweeney won the Democratic primary and ran unopposed in the general election to win a term for governor in his own right.

Democratic primary
The South Carolina Democratic Party held their primary for governor on August 28 and incumbent Governor McSweeney was the frontrunner. McSweeney favored the continuation of the state Dispensary which brought the backing of influential Senator and former Governor Ben Tillman. Prohibitionist James A. Hoyt won second place in the primary to advance to the runoff on September 11, but could not overcome McSweeney because the voters of the state simply did not want any alteration of an institution set up by Ben Tillman.

General election
The general election was held on November 6, 1900 and Miles Benjamin McSweeney was elected to a second term as governor of South Carolina without opposition. Turnout greatly increased over the previous gubernatorial election because there was also a presidential election on the ballot.

 

|-
| 
| colspan=5 |Democratic hold
|-

See also
Governor of South Carolina
List of governors of South Carolina
South Carolina gubernatorial elections

References

"Report of M.R. Cooper, Secretary of State, to the General Assembly of South Carolina." Reports and Resolutions of the General Assembly of the State of South Carolina. Volume I. Columbia, South Carolina: The State Company, 1901, pp. 82–83.

External links
SCIway Biography of Miles Benjamin McSweeney

1900 United States gubernatorial elections
1900
Gubernatorial
November 1900 events